Beast of Dreams is the fifth and final studio album by American noise rock and Industrial music band Pain Teens, released on October 24, 1995 by Trance Syndicate.

Music 
Ayers has described the music on Destroy Me, Lover as being more eccentric than the band's previous releases, attributing the inclusion of instruments such as a sitar, violin, and upright bass as attributing to the records diverse sound.

Reception 

Vincent Jeffries of allmusic gave it 3 out of 5 stars, complimenting Ayers musicianship but criticizing the record for becoming "synthetic and repetitive."

Track listing

Personnel 
Adapted from the Beast of Dreams liner notes.

Pain Teens
 Scott Ayers – guitar, bass guitar, drums, violin, sitar, sampler, electronics, tape, production, engineering
 Bliss Blood – lead vocals

Production and additional personnel
 Nikki Lewis – photography
 Pain Teens – recording
 Tim Thompson – design

Release history

References

External links 
 Beast of Dreams at Bandcamp
 

1995 albums
Pain Teens albums
Albums produced by Scott Ayers
Trance Syndicate albums